Helatoba-Tarutung is a group of sulfurous hot springs in the south of Lake Toba. It stretches 40 km along  the Renun-Toru geological fault zone. The last eruption took place during the Pleistocene age.

See also 

 List of volcanoes in Indonesia

Landforms of Sumatra
Volcanism of Indonesia
Hot springs of Indonesia
Landforms of North Sumatra